Nestor was a  74-gun ship of the line of the French Navy.

Career 

On 2 December 1812, she accidentally collided with the corvette  in the Roads of Toulon.

Decommissioned at the Bourbon Restoration in 1814, on 3 March 1822 she was ordered to be razeed to a frigate, but the order was rescinded on 22 May.

Nestor was refitted in 1823. She was reactivated in 1830 and took part in the Invasion of Algiers.

Plans were drawn up in 1846-49 to convert her to steam. The order to do so was given on 24 April 1848, and she was to receive a 450bhp engine. However, a survey determined that Nestor was too rotted. Instead, on 29 August 1849 she was converted to a prison hulk. The engine that had been acquired for her went instead to the 90-gun .

Nestor was broken up before 1865.

Notes, citations, and references

Notes

Citations

References

Winfield, Rif & Stephen S Roberts (2015) French Warships in the Age of Sail 1786 - 1861: Design Construction, Careers and Fates. (Seaforth Publishing). 

Ships of the line of the French Navy
Téméraire-class ships of the line
1810 ships